Hilly Creek is a  long 1st order tributary to the Hyco River in Halifax County, Virginia.  Flat Branch joins Hyco River in John H. Kerr Reservoir (Buggs Island Reservoir in Virginia).  This is the only stream of this name in the United States.

Course
Hilly Creek rises in a pond at Omega, Virginia and then flows southeast to join the Hyco River in John H. Kerr Reservoir about 1.5 miles south-southeast of Omega.

Watershed
Hilly Creek drains  of area, receives about 45.6 in/year of precipitation, has a wetness index of 370.38, and is about 63% forested.

See also
List of rivers of Virginia

References

Rivers of Virginia
Rivers of Halifax County, Virginia
Tributaries of the Roanoke River